4:4:4 may refer to:

Digital images or video in which all color components have the same sampling rate, thus not using chroma subsampling
Another name for the RGB color space

See also 
 444 (disambiguation)
 4:44 (disambiguation)